The L. D. Fargo Public Library is located in Lake Mills, Wisconsin.

History
The library was gifted to Lake Mills by businessman Lorenzo Dow Fargo. It was listed on the National Register of Historic Places in 1982 and on the State Register of Historic Places in 1989.

References

Libraries on the National Register of Historic Places in Wisconsin
National Register of Historic Places in Jefferson County, Wisconsin
Public libraries in Wisconsin
Gothic Revival architecture in Wisconsin
Library buildings completed in 1902